Homer is an unincorporated community in Angelina County, Texas, United States, southeast of Lufkin, in Deep East Texas. It was reported to have a population of about 360 in the early 1990s through 2000. It is located within the Lufkin, Texas micropolitan area.

History
Homer has a long and rich history. It served as the third of four county seats in Angelina County. Residents of the community voted in 1858 to make it the county seat instead of nearby Jonesville, as well as rename the community to Angelina, but residents continued to call it Homer. It was officially changed back to this name in 1862. The courthouse in Marion (the first county seat) was moved to Homer in 1858. Construction of the community's courthouse began in 1861 but was then stopped due to the American Civil War. Only one wall was finished, but it was later knocked down. In 1873, a new two-story frame courthouse was built, and completed, in Homer. It became the most prosperous community in Angelina County from 1858 through the early 1880s and had the county's first church, a majority of the county's major businesses, and the county's first mechanical sawmill. In 1881, the Houston, East, and West Texas Railway built a track through the nearby city of Lufkin, which was the community's main economic rival. Rumors spread in the community for several years that the railroad's survey crew purposely bypassed Homer after they were angry that they were arrested in the community after a drunken brawl. However, it was found out to be false; in reality, they decided to build the track through Lufkin because the route was easier to follow, and many residents of the nearby city donated plots of land for it. The community never had a population greater than 500, even at its most prosperous point. There were many attempts made to move the courthouse to Lufkin after many of the county's businesses were moved there to be closer to the railroad, but an election held in 1885 resulted in a unanimous vote to keep Homer as the county seat. The community was prosperous in the 1880s, even though the railroad was located 6 miles north. It had a population of 300, three churches, two gristmills, a steam-powered sawmill, a cotton gin and daily mail delivery in 1884. Its most common commodities were lumber, livestock, and cotton. It all came to an end in November 1891, when the Homer courthouse burned to the ground. An undressed leading merchant was said to have run through the fire shouting, "This is the work of Lufkin!" Lufkin then became the county seat that next year, and Homer's population plunged. Its population was reduced by two after a bloody feud between two families surnamed Scroggins and Borden in 1900. The community had a population of 166 in 1904, then went down to 75 a decade later. It grew to 130 in 1925. It continued to grow in the 1960s and by the end of the decade, it had a shopping center and several new homes built. Although it is unincorporated, both the Handbook of Texas and Texas Escapes magazine state that residents voted to incorporate it in 1971. It had a population of 360 from the early 1990s through 2000.     

Today, Homer is so small that the residents have Lufkin mailing addresses. Also, the majority of the residents consider themselves Lufkin residents, rather than Homer ones.

Geography

Education
Homer had two schools in 1884. Students study in the Lufkin Independent School District.

References

Unincorporated communities in Texas
Unincorporated communities in Angelina County, Texas